Puti Tipene (Steve) Watene (18 August 1910 – 14 June 1967), of Ngāti Maru and Te Arawa, was a New Zealand rugby league footballer and politician. He was the first Māori to captain the New Zealand league side and he is the only person to both represent the New Zealand national rugby league team and become a Member of Parliament. He is the great-grandfather of New Zealand Rugby League player Dallin Watene-Zelezniak.

Early years
A strong member of the Mormon faith, Watene was born in Thames in 1910. He attended Thames High School, Opotiki District High School and then the Māori Agriculture College in the Hawkes Bay before he moved to Auckland where he worked as a labourer and a clerk.

Rugby league

In Auckland Watene joined the City rugby league club in the Auckland Rugby League competition in 1929 and represented and captained Auckland. He debuted for Auckland in a 22–19 win over Northland at Carlaw Park. In the 1933 Auckland Rugby League season Watene top scored in the senor grade competitions with 77 points from 1 try, 26 conversions and 11 penalties. In 1936 Watene joined the newly re-formed Manukau side. He was the club's captain and played a major role in attracting many other Māori players to the club. As a result, Manukau quickly became a force in the Auckland competition, winning both the Fox Memorial and Roope Rooster in their debut year. He also played lock for the New Zealand Māori rugby league team, who secured a famous 16–5 victory over Australia in 1937 at Carlaw Park in front of 11,000 spectators.

Watene was first selected for the New Zealand national rugby league team while only 19 in 1930 and played for them until 1937. Watene was part of the first ever Auckland Māori rugby league team which played 4 matches in 1934 of which he played in all of them. He played 2 further matches in 1935. He also captained the New Zealand national rugby league team in 1936 and 1937, becoming the first Māori to do so. In 1943 he played a preseason match for Newton Rangers before returning back to his Manukau side which won the Fox Memorial, Rukutai Shield, Roope Rooster, and Stormont Shield. They were the first club to ever achieve this feat. During the season he also captained a City Rovers side which played Wellington Māori at Newtown Park in Wellington. The City side lost 31-13. The following season he became captain coach of the Newton Rangers before retiring from the game.

After retiring he remained involved in rugby league, coaching and selecting representative sides and working as an administrator. In 2008 he was named a New Zealand Rugby League Legend of League.

Local politics
Watene was politically active and during the 1951 waterfront dispute he toured the districts on behalf of the New Zealand Waterside Workers’ Union, urging Māori not to work as strike breakers.

In 1953 he was elected to the Mount Wellington Borough Council. He served until 1956, after which Mt Wellington named a street, Watene Road, after him.

He moved to Petone in 1956, working as a hostel manager and industrial welfare officer, and between 1962 and 1965 he served on the Petone Borough Council.

Watene also served on the New Zealand Māori Council.

Member of Parliament

A member of the New Zealand Labour Party, Watene had served on the national executive for six years before being elected as the Member of Parliament for Eastern Maori in November 1963, following the retirement of Ratana MP Tiaki Omana.  As a Mormon, Watene's election broke the Ratana stranglehold on the Māori seats.

He was re-elected in 1966, but on 14 June 1967 suffered a heart attack and died in Parliament Buildings during a Maori Affairs Committee meeting.

References

Tribute to the late P. T. (Steve) Watene The Maori Magazine, September 1967
Unveiling at Petone The Maori Magazine, September 1968

1910 births
1967 deaths
20th-century New Zealand politicians
Auckland rugby league team players
City Rovers players
Manukau Magpies players
Members of the New Zealand House of Representatives
New Zealand Labour Party MPs
New Zealand Latter Day Saints
New Zealand Māori rugby league players
New Zealand Māori rugby league team players
New Zealand MPs for Māori electorates
New Zealand national rugby league team captains
New Zealand national rugby league team players
New Zealand rugby league administrators
New Zealand rugby league coaches
New Zealand rugby league players
New Zealand sportsperson-politicians
Ngāti Maru (Hauraki)
North Island rugby league team players
People educated at Thames High School
Rugby league fullbacks
Rugby league locks
Rugby league players from Thames, New Zealand
Rugby league wingers
Te Arawa people